Kani Sorkh (also Romanized as Kānī Sorkh) is a village in Haq Rural District, Nalus District, Oshnavieh County, West Azerbaijan Province, Iran. At the 2006 census, its population was 419, in 65 families.

References 

Populated places in Oshnavieh County